LATAM Chile (previously known as LAN Express) is a chilean airline based in Santiago, Chile. It operates few domestic flights for its parent. Its main hub is Arturo Merino Benítez International Airport.

History
The airline was established as Ladeco by Juan Costabal Echeñique on November 1, 1958, flying mostly internal routes between Chile's major cities. Initially, the company mainly flew domestic services, but later served international routes to the Caribbean and North America.

In 1993, Ladeco was sold 37.35% to Iberia, which in turn approved the sale to LAN-Chile. In 1994, LAN-Chile bought over 99.41% of the shares and merged Ladeco into its fleet. At the time of the takeover, The airline was equipped mainly with Boeing 737s as well as some 727s and 757s. It then became exclusively an internal carrier between Chilean cities. In October 1998, Ladeco was merged with Fast Air Carrier. In 2000, Ladeco and LAN-Chile became the first airlines in the world to certify their flight operations, incorporating the TQM methodology. On October 28, 2001, Ladeco was officially rebranded as a new affiliate of LAN-Chile named LAN Express, and most internal operations were taken by. The brand was then merged back into LAN Airlines in 2006, although it operated some domestic flights using the code of LAN Express. 

On May 5, 2016, the airline was rebranded to LATAM Express as a result of the LATAM Airlines Group merger. The airline had faced a long-lasting strike that cancelled most of its flights in April 2018.

Destinations
LATAM Express operates the following services (as of August 2017):

Fleet

Current fleet

The airline's fleet consists of the following aircraft as of March 2021:

Former fleet

As Ladeco and LAN Express, the airline previously operated the following aircraft:

During the 1960s, the airline operated a number of Douglas DC-3s, with their cargo fleet also including three Boeing 707s.

Accidents and incidents
On April 8, 1968, a Douglas C-49K (registration CC-CBM) crashed on approach to Balmaceda Airport killing all 36 people on board. The aircraft was operating a domestic scheduled passenger flight from Los Cerrillos Airport, Santiago.

On May 17, 1999, a Boeing 737-200 (registration CC-CYR) was damaged beyond repairs after one of its fuel tanks burst into flames during refueling at Arturo Merino Benítez International Airport.

See also
List of airlines of Chile

References

External links

LAN Airlines
LAN Express Fleet

Airlines of Chile
E
Former Oneworld affiliate members
Chilean companies established in 1958